The Omaumau River is a middle order stream in the Auckland Region of New Zealand's North Island. The catchment consists of rural pasture and fragmented native forest.

See also
List of rivers of New Zealand

References
 
Omaumau River - Land Air Water Aotearoa (LAWA)

Rivers of the Auckland Region
Kaipara Harbour catchment